Club Deportivo Marchamalo is a football team based in Marchamalo. Founded in 1973, the team plays in Segunda División RFEF – Group 5. The club's home ground is Estadio La Solana.

Season to season

1 season in Segunda División RFEF
14 seasons in Tercera División

References

External links
Official website 
Futbolme team profile 

Football clubs in Castilla–La Mancha
Association football clubs established in 1973
1973 establishments in Spain
Province of Guadalajara